Etienne Renkewitz is a German professional ice hockey goaltender who currently plays for DEG Metro Stars of the Deutsche Eishockey Liga (DEL).

References

Living people
DEG Metro Stars players
Year of birth missing (living people)
German ice hockey goaltenders